Chorti may refer to:
 Ch'orti' (disambiguation)
 Chorti, Iran

es:Chortis